Dame Nerys Angharad Jefford, styled The Honourable Mrs Justice Jefford, DBE (born 25 December 1962) is a High Court Judge of England and Wales.

Early life
She was born in Swansea, Wales and educated at Olchfa School, and graduated from Lady Margaret Hall, Oxford in 1984, followed by an LLM from the University of Virginia in 1985, where she was a Fulbright Scholar.

Career
Jefford was called to the Bar at Gray's Inn in 1986, became a QC in 2008, and was appointed as a Recorder in 2007. In addition to practice, Jefford contributed to Keating on Construction Contracts from the fifth edition in 1991 to the eighth edition in 2006.

High Court appointment 
On 3 October 2016, she was appointed as a High Court judge, assigned to the Queen's Bench Division. 

She is currently the Presiding Judge for Wales and sits on the Technology and Construction Court.

In July 2021, Jefford made legal history as part of the first all-female Court of Appeal panel in Wales, sitting alongside Lady Justice Nicola Davies and Mrs Justice Steyn.

Honours
In 2016, Jefford was made a Dame Commander of the Order of the British Empire (DBE).

References

Living people
1962 births
Dames Commander of the Order of the British Empire
Alumni of Lady Margaret Hall, Oxford
University of Virginia School of Law alumni
21st-century English judges
British barristers
21st-century King's Counsel
People from Swansea
Members of Gray's Inn